Richard Bruning or Bryning (by 1531–1573/1580), was an English politician.

He was a Member (MP) of the Parliament of England for Wootton Bassett in 1555 and 1558.

References

16th-century deaths
Year of birth uncertain
English MPs 1555
English MPs 1558